Kalani Queypo (born September 6, 1986) is an American actor best known for his role as Chacrow on Jamestown and Klah Jackson on Fear the Walking Dead.

Biography
Kalani Queypo claimed that he grew up being "artistic". His family were dancers and he was trained in classic hula dancing. He was raised by a single mother as his father passed away when he was nine. He had initially wanted to be a lawyer and then a news anchor. When he was placed in an acting program in school, he realized he could be those two things and more. "I think that what interested me was human behavior and the way that people related to each other and I think my family really developed a great empathy with me and the arts sort of found me". After graduating high school, he began searching for acting programs until he decided to move to New York to expand his career.

He found his way into starring in numerous television projects such as Into the West, Mad Men and Saints & Strangers as Squanto. He also appeared in the Terrence Malick epic The New World. He appeared as Klah Jackson on Fear the Walking Dead and has a major role as Chacrow in Jamestown.

At the 9th Canadian Screen Awards in 2021, he received a nomination for Best Supporting Actor in a Drama Series for Trickster.

Personal life
Queypo is a founding member of the National American Indian Committee at SAG/AFTRA.

Filmography

References

External links

1986 births
Living people
Male actors from Hawaii
American male actors
American people of Filipino descent